Marian Jabłoński (4 February 1922 – 11 March 2004) was a Polish footballer. He played in three matches for the Poland national football team from 1947 to 1949.

References

External links
 

1922 births
2004 deaths
Polish footballers
Poland international footballers
Place of birth missing
Association footballers not categorized by position